Bovin is a surname. In Russia, it is given to males, while its feminine counterpart is Bovina. Bovin is also an unrelated Swedish surname of Walloon origin that has several variants. The surname may refer to
Alexander Bovin (1930–2004), Soviet and Russian journalist, political scientist and diplomat
Birthe Bovin (1906–1980), Danish painter 
Doug Bovin, American politician
Elena Bovina (born 1983), Russian tennis player
Johan Anton Bovin (1823–1894), jurist and member of the Swedish parliament
Karl Bovin (1907–1985), Danish painter, husband of Birthe
Karl Emil Bovin (1868–1962), Swedish physician
Knut Adolf Bovin (1853–1926), landscape architect, landscape gardener, publicist and writer
Oleg Bovin (born 1946), Russian water polo player

Russian-language surnames
Swedish-language surnames